Daniel A. Nathan is an American scholar who is the Douglas Family Chair in American Culture, History, and Literary and Interdisciplinary Studies at Skidmore College.

Nathan received his M.A. and Ph.D. in American Studies from the University of Iowa.

Nathan is known for his research on American sport, memory, and cultural representation.

Books
Saying It's So: A Cultural History of the Black Sox Scandal (2003)
Rooting for the Home Team: Sport, Community, and Identity (2013)
Baltimore Sports: Stories from Charm City (2016)
Baseball Beyond Our Borders: An International Pastime (2017), edited with George Gmelch

Fellowships and awards

 Edwin M. Moseley Faculty Lectureship, 2021-2022
 North American Society for Sport History Book Award (anthology), 2014
 National Endowment for the Humanities Fellowship, 2005-06
 Webb-Smith Essay Competition winner (with Peter Berg and Erin Klemyk), 2005
 USA Track & Field Ken Doherty Memorial Fellowship, 2004
 North American Society for Sport History Book Award, 2004
 North American Society for the Sociology of Sport Book Award (monograph), 2003
 Fulbright Grantee, University of Tampere, Finland, 2001-02
 University of Iowa Ada Louisa Ballard/Seashore Dissertation Fellowship, 1996-97

References

Date of birth missing (living people)
Living people
Skidmore College faculty
University of Iowa alumni
Cultural academics
Place of birth missing (living people)
Year of birth missing (living people)